Siliguri Institute of Technology (informally SIT) is a private engineering and management college, established in 1999 in Siliguri, West Bengal, India. Initially the college was under North Bengal University and from the year 2004 came under the control of the newly formed West Bengal University of Technology (now renamed as Maulana Abul Kalam Azad University of Technology). The college is a part of Techno India Group.

Academics
This college offers Bachelor of Technology in Computer Science and Engineering, Electrical Engineering, Electronics and Communication Engineering, Civil Engineering, and Information Technology. It also offers MCA, BBA (H), MBA, BCA and BTTM, BBA in Hospital Management and BHHA amongst other courses.

Gallery

See also

References

External links

Private engineering colleges in India
Colleges affiliated to West Bengal University of Technology
Engineering colleges in West Bengal
Universities and colleges in Darjeeling district
Education in Siliguri
Educational institutions established in 1999
1999 establishments in West Bengal